The Appalachian State Mountaineers football statistical leaders are individual statistical leaders of the Appalachian State Mountaineers football program in various categories, including passing, rushing, receiving, total offense, defensive stats, kicking, and scoring. Within those areas, the lists identify single-game, single-season, and career leaders. The Mountaineers represent Appalachian State University in the NCAA Division I FBS Sun Belt Conference.

Although Appalachian State began competing in intercollegiate football in 1928, the school's official record book considers the "modern era" to have begun in 1957. Records from before this year are often incomplete and inconsistent, and they are generally not included in these lists.

These lists are dominated by more recent players for several reasons:
 Since 1957, seasons in the top level of college football, now Division I FBS, have increased from 10 games to 11 and then 12 games in length.
 From 1982 through 2013, Appalachian State played in the second level of Division I football, currently known as Division I FCS (known before the 2006 season as Division I-AA). While regular seasons at that level remain limited to 11 games in most years, two aspects of FCS rules allow for more games.
 The NCAA organizes an FCS championship tournament, currently called the NCAA Division I Football Championship. The Mountaineers reached the FCS playoffs 20 times, playing 41 games, between 1986 and 2012 (they were ineligible for the 2013 playoffs due to their FBS transition), giving many players extra games to accumulate statistics. The NCAA did not count I-AA/FCS playoff games toward official season statistics until 2002. Since 2006, Appalachian has not included statistics from pre-2002 playoff games (19 in all) when compiling single-season and career records.
 Additionally, current NCAA rules allow FCS teams to schedule 12 regular-season games in years when the period starting with the Thursday before Labor Day and ending with the final Saturday in November contains 14 Saturdays.
 The NCAA did not count bowl games toward official season statistics until 2002 (at that time, Appalachian was in what is now known as FCS). The Mountaineers have appeared in a bowl game in each season since they were first eligible for such games in the 2015 season.
 The Sun Belt Conference has held a championship game since 2018. Appalachian State played in and won the first two title games (2018 and 2019), providing yet another game for players to accumulate statistics in those seasons. 
 The NCAA didn't allow freshmen to play varsity football until 1972 (with the exception of the World War II years), allowing players to have four-year careers.
 Due to COVID-19 issues, the NCAA ruled that the 2020 season would not count against the athletic eligibility of any football player, giving everyone who played in that season the opportunity for five years of eligibility instead of the normal four.

These lists are updated through Appalachian's game against Coastal Carolina on November 3, 2022.

Passing

Passing yards

Passing touchdowns

Rushing

Rushing yards

Rushing touchdowns

Receiving

Receptions

Receiving yards

Receiving touchdowns

Total offense
Total offense is the sum of passing and rushing statistics. It does not include receiving or returns.

Total offense yards

Touchdowns responsible for
"Touchdowns responsible for" is the official NCAA term for combined passing and rushing touchdowns.

Defense

Interceptions

Tackles

Sacks

Kicking

Field goals made

Field goal percentage

Scoring (points)
App State's record books include leaders in points scored over all relevant time frames (career, single-season, and single-game), but do not list leaders in total touchdowns scored (as opposed to "touchdowns responsible for", listed in the "Total offense" section).

References

Appalachian State